This is a list of American Civil War units from Iowa which fought in the Union Army. A total of 48 infantry regiments, nine cavalry regiments, and four artillery batteries were raised from Iowa.

Infantry
1st Iowa Infantry Regiment
1st Iowa Infantry Regiment (African Descent)
2nd Iowa Infantry Regiment
3rd Iowa Infantry Regiment
4th Iowa Infantry Regiment
5th Iowa Infantry Regiment
6th Iowa Infantry Regiment
7th Iowa Infantry Regiment
8th Iowa Infantry Regiment
9th Iowa Infantry Regiment
10th Iowa Infantry Regiment
11th Iowa Infantry Regiment
12th Iowa Infantry Regiment
13th Iowa Infantry Regiment
14th Iowa Infantry Regiment
15th Iowa Infantry Regiment
16th Iowa Infantry Regiment
17th Iowa Infantry Regiment
18th Iowa Infantry Regiment
19th Iowa Infantry Regiment
20th Iowa Infantry Regiment
21st Iowa Infantry Regiment
22nd Iowa Infantry Regiment
23rd Iowa Infantry Regiment
24th Iowa Infantry Regiment
25th Iowa Infantry Regiment
26th Iowa Infantry Regiment
27th Iowa Infantry Regiment
28th Iowa Infantry Regiment
29th Iowa Infantry Regiment
30th Iowa Infantry Regiment
31st Iowa Infantry Regiment
32nd Iowa Infantry Regiment
33rd Iowa Infantry Regiment
34th Iowa Infantry Regiment
35th Iowa Infantry Regiment
36th Iowa Infantry Regiment
37th Iowa Infantry Regiment - The "Graybeard Regiment"
38th Iowa Infantry Regiment
39th Iowa Infantry Regiment
40th Iowa Infantry Regiment
41st Iowa Infantry Regiment - Failed to complete organization and was not mustered into service.
41st Battalion Iowa Volunteer Infantry
42nd Iowa Infantry Regiment - Failed to complete organization and was not mustered into service.
43rd Iowa Infantry Regiment - Failed to complete organization and was not mustered into service.
44th Iowa Infantry Regiment - 100-day service regiment
45th Iowa Infantry Regiment - 100-day service regiment
46th Iowa Infantry Regiment - 100-day service regiment
47th Iowa Infantry Regiment - 100-day service regiment
48th Iowa Infantry Regiment - 100-day service regiment, failed to complete organization and was not mustered as regiment, see 48th Battalion Iowa Volunteer Infantry.
48th Iowa Infantry Battalion - 100-day service unit

Cavalry
1st Iowa Cavalry Regiment
2nd Iowa Cavalry Regiment
3rd Iowa Cavalry Regiment
4th Iowa Cavalry Regiment
5th Iowa Cavalry Regiment
6th Iowa Cavalry Regiment
7th Iowa Cavalry Regiment
8th Iowa Cavalry Regiment
9th Iowa Cavalry Regiment

Artillery
1st Iowa Independent Battery Light Artillery
2nd Iowa Independent Battery Light Artillery
3rd Iowa Independent Battery Light Artillery - "The Dubuque Battery"
4th Iowa Independent Battery Light Artillery

See also
Iowa in the American Civil War
Lists of American Civil War Regiments by State
United States Colored Troops

Notes

References
The Civil War Archive

 
Iowa
Civil War